Lindi Schroeder (born 22 September 2001) is an American swimmer.

She represented Team USA in the 2020 Tokyo Olympics, where she competed in the artistic swimming (women's duet) event alongside Anita Álvarez.

The pair finished thirteen in their preliminary, failing to advance to the final.

Career highlights 

 2014 UANA Pan American Championships: 4th (Figures), 1st (Team)
 2015 Mediterranean Cup: 13th (Figures)
 2015 UANA Pan American Championships: 1st (Team)
 2016 U.S. National Championships: 1st (13-15 Figures), 1st (13-15 Solo), 4th (Junior Figures), 3rd (Junior Duet)
 2016 13-15 and Junior National Team
 2016 Mediterranean Cup: 4th (Solo)
 2016 UANA Pan American Championships: 1st (13-15 Solo), 1st (Figures)
 2017 Swiss Open: 2nd (Tech Team)
 2017 Junior/Senior National Team
 2018 UANA Pan American Championships: 1st (Team)
 2019 Pan American Games Bronze Medalist
 2019 US Open: 2nd (Team), 3rd (Free Duet)
 2019 Spanish Open: 6th (Tech Team), 7th (Free Team), 6th (Free Duet)
 2020 French Open: 3rd (Tech Duet), 3rd (Free Duet), 2nd (Tech Team)
 2021 FINA Artistic Swimming Virtual World Series USA: 1st (Tech Duet), 1st (Free Duet), 1st (Free Team)
 2021 FINA Artistic Swimming Virtual World Series Canada: 1st (Tech Duet), 1st (Free Duet), 1st (Free Team)
 2021 FINA Artistic Swimming World Series Super Final: 4th (Duet Tech), 5th (Duet Free), 4th (Team Tech), 4th (Team Free)

References 

2001 births
Living people
American synchronized swimmers
Synchronized swimmers at the 2020 Summer Olympics
Olympic synchronized swimmers of the United States
Pan American Games medalists in synchronized swimming
Sportspeople from Boston
Pan American Games bronze medalists for the United States
Medalists at the 2019 Pan American Games